Crataegus pruinosa is a species of hawthorn known by the common name frosted hawthorn. It is native to a wide area of the eastern United States and southern Canada, and is sometimes considered to be several species, rather than just one.

The pulp of the small fruits is edible.

Varieties
The following varieties are recognized in the Flora of North America (2015):

 C. pruinosa var. pruinosa, synonyms:
C. bracteata Sarg.
C. tumida Sarg.
 C. pruinosa var. dissona (Sarg.) Eggl., synonyms:
C. dissona Sarg.
C. brachypoda Sarg.
C. disjuncta Sarg.
C. rigida Sarg.
 C. pruinosa var. parvula (Sarg.) J.B.Phipps, synonyms:
C. parvula Sarg.
 C. pruinosa var. rugosa (Ashe) Kruschke, synonyms:
C. rugosa Ashe
C. leiophylla Sarg.
C. mackenziei Sarg. ex Mackenzie
C. rubicundula Sarg.
C. seclusa Sarg.
C. seducta Sarg.
 C. pruinosa var. virella (Ashe) Kruschke, synonyms:
C. virella Ashe
 C. pruinosa var. magnifolia (Sarg.) J.B.Phipps, synonyms:
C. magnifolia Sarg.

References

External links

pruinosa
Flora of the Great Lakes region (North America)
Flora of Eastern Canada
Flora of the Eastern United States
Trees of the Northeastern United States
Trees of the Southeastern United States
Trees of the Great Lakes region (North America)
Flora without expected TNC conservation status